Sir William Guy Fison, MC 3rd Baronet (25 October 1890 – 6 December 1964) was a British rower who competed in the 1912 Summer Olympics.

Fison was educated at Eton College and New College, Oxford. He was the bowman of the New College eight which won the silver medal for Great Britain rowing at the 1912 Summer Olympics.

In the First World War, Fison served as captain in the Royal Field Artillery. He was mentioned in despatches, and awarded the M.C. He inherited the baronetcy on the death of his brother in 1948.

Fison married Gwladys Rees Davies, daughter of John Robert Davies, on 3 February 1914.

References

External links
profile

1890 births
1964 deaths
People educated at Eton College
Alumni of New College, Oxford
Baronets in the Baronetage of the United Kingdom
British Army personnel of World War I
English male rowers
British male rowers
Olympic rowers of Great Britain
Recipients of the Military Cross
Rowers at the 1912 Summer Olympics
Olympic silver medallists for Great Britain
Royal Artillery officers
Olympic medalists in rowing
Medalists at the 1912 Summer Olympics